Lipova is a river in Romania. It is a left tributary of the Tutova. It flows into the Tutova in Băbuța.

References

Rivers of Romania
Rivers of Bacău County
Rivers of Vaslui County